The abbreviation NMS may refer to:

Science and technology
Network monitoring system
Network management station
Network management system
Neurally mediated syncope
Neuroleptic malignant syndrome
non-maximum suppression (e.g. Canny edge detection)
Neuromedin S, neuropeptide

Institutions
 New Member States, the 10 member states that joined the EU in May 2004
 National Military Strategy
 National Merit Scholarship
 National Market System of stock listing and trading
 Regulation NMS, a Security and Exchange Commission regulation for the national market system
 National Museum of Singapore
 National Museums of Scotland
 Nepal Mathematical Society
 New Media Strategies
 National Movement Simeon II party in Bulgaria
 Norwegian Missionary Society
 Nagel Middle School, a public middle school located in Hamilton County, Ohio
 Normandin Middle School, A middle school in New Bedford, Massachusetts
 North Miami Senior High School
 Nigerian Military School
 Nari Mukti Sangh
 Nippon Medical School
 Northwest Microcomputer Systems, a defunct microcomputer company

Other
Nintendo Magazine System, a defunct British magazine, now known as Official Nintendo Magazine, launched in October 1992 and folded in January 2006
Nintendo Magazine System (Australia), a defunct Australian magazine launched in April 1993 and folded in August 2000
 New Music Seminar, a now defunct annual summer music showcase in New York City
 A hip-hop group on the Big Dada label
 , the prefix of Romanian Royal Navy ship names (1881 - 1947)
 National Marine Sanctuary
 Volkswagen New Midsize Sedan, an automobile 
 New make spirit, a stage in the distillation of Scotch whisky
 No Man's Sky, a 2016 video game developed by Hello Games